Shuyga is a rural locality (a settlement) in Surskoye Rural Settlement of Pinezhsky District, Arkhangelsk Oblast, Russia. The population was 472 as of 2010. There are 11 streets.

Geography 
Shuyga is located on the Shuyga River, 99 km southeast of Karpogory (the district's administrative centre) by road. Shulomen is the nearest rural locality.

References 

Rural localities in Pinezhsky District